Yushu is a county-level city of Jilin Province, Northeast China, it is under the administration of the prefecture-level city of Changchun. The name of the place means "Elm Tree". The northernmost county-level division of Changchun, it borders Dehui to the southwest as well as the prefecture-level division of Harbin (Heilongjiang) to the northeast.

Administrative divisions

There are four subdistricts, 16 towns, 20 townships, and one ethnic township.

Subdistricts:
Huachang Subdistrict, Zhenyang Subdistrict, Peiying Subdistrict, Chengjiao Subdistrict

Towns:
Sihe, Daling, Dapo, Huaijia, Tuqiao, Xinli, Heilin, Wukeshu, Minjia, Xiangyang, Gongpeng, Baoshou, Xiushui, Liujia, Bahao, Xinzhuang

Townships:
Huancheng Township, Chengfa Township, Lihe Township, Yujia Township, Qingding Township, Shisihu Township, Guangming Township, Xiejia Township, Fu'an Township, Dayu Township, Xuanfeng Township, Qianjin Township, Wulong Township, Dagang Township, Shuangjing Township, Hongxing Township, Siyu Township, Tai'an Township, Yumin Township, Qingshan Township, Yanhe Korean Ethnic Township

Climate

References

External links

 
Changchun
County-level divisions of Jilin
Cities in Jilin